is a JR East railway station located in the city of Kazuno, Akita Prefecture, Japan.

Lines
Kazuno-Hanawa Station is served by the Hanawa Line, and is located 69.7 rail kilometers from the terminus of the line at Kōma Station.

Station layout
Kazuno-Hanawa Station has one island platform serving two tracks. The station has a Midori no Madoguchi staffed ticket office.

Platforms

History
The line was nationalized on June 1, 1934, becoming part of the Japanese Government Railways (JGR) system. The JGR became the Japan National Railways (JNR) after World War II. The station was absorbed into the JR East network upon the privatization of the JNR on April 1, 1987. The station was renamed to its present name on December 1, 1995.

Passenger statistics
In fiscal 2018, the station was used by an average of 200 passengers daily (boarding passengers only).

Bus services
Shūhoku Bus
For Lake Towada via Towada-Minami Station and Ōyu-Onsen
For Kosaka
For Hanawa
Towada taxi bus
For Yonnotai via Ōyu-Onsen
Highway bus
For Morioka Station (Michinoku)
For Sendai Station (Sendai Ōdate, reserved seat only)

Surrounding area
Tohoku Expressway – Kazuno-Hachimantai Interchange
Osarizawa Mine National Historic Site

See also
 List of Railway Stations in Japan

References

External links

  

Railway stations in Japan opened in 1923
Kazuno, Akita
Hanawa Line
Railway stations in Akita Prefecture
Stations of East Japan Railway Company